Shadowland is the fifth studio album by Swedish power metal band Nocturnal Rites, released in 2002.

Track listing
 "Eyes of the Dead" - 4:53
 "Shadowland" - 4:23
 "Invincible" - 4:57
 "Revelation" - 4:44
 "Never Die" - 4:23
 "Underworld" - 4:27
 "Vengeance" - 5:19
 "Faceless God" - 5:14
 "Birth of Chaos" - 4:16
 "The Watcher" - 4:00

Personnel
 Jonny Lindkvist - vocals
 Nils Norberg - lead guitar, guitar synthesizer and effects
 Fredrik Mannberg - guitar
 Mattias Bernhardsson - keyboards
 Nils Eriksson - bass guitar
 Owe Lingvall - drums

References

2002 albums
Nocturnal Rites albums
Century Media Records albums